Basile M. Missir (17 July 1843 – 21 April 1929) was a Romanian lawyer and politician.

Early life
Born in Focșani, he came from a prominent Armenian family that included Petru Th. Missir and Basile's nephew Ioan Missir. He enrolled in the law faculty of Iași University in 1860, later earning his degree from the University of Paris. Entering the magistracy, he became a prosecutor in 1869 and chief prosecutor later the same year, at the Ilfov County tribunal in Bucharest. In 1870, he was hired as a prosecutor at the appeals court in the same city. From 1872 to 1874, no longer a magistrate, he was state's attorney at the High Court of Cassation and Justice.

Political activity
After joining the National Liberal Party, he was Prefect of Brăila County from 1877 to 1878. From 1880 to 1889, he was state's attorney for the Bucharest tribunals. In 1896, he entered the dissident drapelist faction, but rejoined the main party in 1899. Meanwhile, he was elected to the Assembly of Deputies in 1897. From February 1901 to July 1902, he was Agriculture and Domains Minister under Dimitrie Sturdza. He initiated a 1902 law regulating labor relations, particularly in small industry. He served as Assembly president from December 1909 to February 1910. Two important laws were adopted during this period: one banned many categories of workers from striking, while another established popular banks. In 1914, he rose to the Senate, where he also served as president from that February until December 1916.

Family
His wife came from the boyar Vrăbiescu family; the couple's daughter Julietta married Scarlat Cantacuzino in 1912.

Notes

1843 births
1929 deaths
People from Focșani
Romanian people of Armenian descent
University of Paris alumni
19th-century Romanian lawyers
Romanian prosecutors
Members of the Chamber of Deputies (Romania)
Presidents of the Chamber of Deputies (Romania)
Members of the Senate of Romania
Presidents of the Senate of Romania
Romanian Ministers of Agriculture
Prefects of Romania
National Liberal Party (Romania) politicians